Almagor may refer to:

Almagor, an Israeli moshav

People
Dan Almagor (born 1935), Israeli playwright
Gila Almagor (born Gila Alexandrowitz; 1939), Israeli actress, film star, and author
Raphael Cohen-Almagor, educator, researcher, and human rights activist